Aloba is a monotypic moth genus in the family Geometridae described by Warren in 1895. Its only species, Aloba cinereus, was first described by William Bartlett-Calvert in 1893. It is found in the Araucanía Region of Chile.

References

Larentiinae
Geometridae genera
Endemic fauna of Chile